The ASVi is a tramway museum in Thuin in Belgium, which specialises in the history of the Belgian narrow gauge Vicinal system. The museum includes an operating museum tram line which runs from Thuin to Lobbes.

The metre gauge historic tram line is made of two sections :

a part of the former vicinal tramway line Thuin - Anderlues (lines 91 and 92). This line was part of the famous and extensive Belgian vicinal tramway network which once covered the whole country ;
a part of the SNCB normal gauge line (line 109 Mons - Chimay) which was converted to metric gauge and equipped with an overhead line for power supply.

Description of the historic line
Leaving the Thuin museum, the line follows first the former SNCB line, and then follows the "avenue de la Couture" towards the cemetery of Thuin and a bridge to cross the Sambre. Then it goes down along the SNCB railway and reaches Lobbes Pont du Nord where it crosses Route Nationale 559. Then it goes around Lobbes along a western itinerary to reach the station Lobbes Hôtel de Ville. From there, the line turns again towards RN 559 to reach it at the level of the station Lobbes Entreville ; from there the line is on the west side of this road to the terminus of Lobbes Bonniers. This northern section is one of the last electrified roadside sections of tramway which remains in Belgium.

From avenue de la Couture, a section of the former vicinal also allows to reach the lower part of Thuin on the banks of Sambre.

In August 2010, a 3 km extension to Biesme-sous-Thuin has been inaugurated. It is established on the platform of the former SNCB line from Mons to Chimay.

Rolling stock

The collection also includes a PCC streetcar which has quite an uncommon story. It is part of a first series of 24 cars built for Belgium in 1950, which were transferred to Belgrade in 1960. One model of this iconic vehicle was brought back to Belgium in 1986.

In working order

Out of order

References

External links 

ASVi museum web page
Tram Travels: Tramway Historique Lobbes-Thuin
Vicinal photo archives web page
TRAMANIA Vicinal sponsoring web page

Tram transport in Belgium
Transport in Belgium
Railway museums in Belgium
Heritage railways in Belgium
Museums in Hainaut (province)
Thuin